Dead on Target is the first book in The Hardy Boys Casefiles series. It was first published in the year 1987.

Plot summary
Joe Hardy's girlfriend, Iola Morton, is caught in a car bomb and dies. Joe is unable to believe it. The brothers begin their investigation. They meet a person who calls himself the "Gray Man," from a government agency called "The Network." Frank and Joe take his help to get to the person who planted the bomb. Soon they learn that it is not a person, but a group of terrorists who call themselves "Assassins."

Joe vows to kill them. As the story progresses, some Assassins are killed in encounters while others escape. They come to know that the person who killed Iola is a member of The Assassins named Al-Rousasa.

When the book is about to end, Frank, Joe, Chet (who is Iola's brother) and their other friends begin searching a shopping mall when they learn that the Assassins plan to kill a presidential candidate giving a speech in Bayport. Soon, Joe and Frank have a fight with Al-Rousasa at the top floor. The fight ends with Al-Rousasa falling to his death, and Joe remembers what he had been told - "Nobody takes an Assassin alive."

Important changes in Dead on Target
Casefile #1, Dead on Target, was a drastic change from the established Hardy Boys world.

 Iola Morton is killed by a terrorist car bomb in the first volume.
 The books become more grisly. Frank and Joe use firearms and investigate murders.
 Chapters no longer have titles, and there are no illustrations.
 The boys collaborate with the Gray Man, who represents a cloak-and-dagger crimefighting unit. (Similar to SKOOL and UGLI from The Secret Agent on Flight 101 ...)

External links
The Hardy Boys Encyclopedia

The Hardy Boys books
1987 American novels
1987 children's books